Budal Church is a parish church within Midtre Gauldal municipality in Trøndelag county, Norway. It is located in the village of Enodden. It is the church for the Budal parish which is part of the Gauldal prosti (deanery) in the Diocese of Nidaros. The red, wooden church was built in 1754 using plans drawn up by an unknown architect. The church was built in a Y-shaped design, which is quite rare in Norway. The church seats about 200 people.

History
The mountain valley of Budal was historically rather isolated from the rest of the parish. During the summer of 1752, the bishop requested a building permit from the government to construct a church in Budal. The permit was approved and the church was completed in 1754. It was consecrated on 19 June 1754. It was built in a Y-shape and it is the most recently built of the 10 existing Y-shaped churches in Norway.

Media gallery

See also
List of churches in Nidaros

References

Midtre Gauldal
Churches in Trøndelag
Y-shaped churches in Norway
Wooden churches in Norway
18th-century Church of Norway church buildings
Churches completed in 1754
1754 establishments in Norway